Populus angustifolia, commonly known as the narrowleaf cottonwood, is a species of tree in the willow family (Salicaceae). It is native to western North America, where it is a characteristic species of the Rocky Mountains and the surrounding plains. It ranges north to the provinces of Alberta and Saskatchewan in Canada and south to the states of Chihuahua, Coahuila, and Sonora in Mexico. Its natural habitat is by streams and creeks between  elevation.

Description
The tree is slim in profile, and can grow in tightly packed clusters. Its leaves are yellow-green, lanceolate (lance-shaped), and with scalloped margins. It produces catkins in the early spring. The fruiting capsules are fluffy and white.

Taxonomy
Where their ranges come into contact, this species will readily hybridize with Populus balsamifera, Populus deltoides, Populus fremontii, and Populus trichocarpa. These hybrids can form extensive populations in some regions. Due to the frequency and morphological consistency of P. angustifolia × P. deltoides hybrids, they were initially described as a fully separate species ("P. acuminata") until its hybrid origin was firmly established in the 1980s.

Uses
The buds are sticky and gummy and were enjoyed as a sort of chewing gum by local Native American peoples, including the Apache and Navajo. The tree is the host species of the sugarbeet root aphid (Pemphigus betae).

References

External links

US Forest Service Fire Ecology
Photo gallery at CalPhotos

angustifolia
Trees of the Great Basin
Trees of the Northwestern United States
Trees of the Southwestern United States
Trees of the South-Central United States
Trees of Alberta
Flora of the California desert regions
Flora of New Mexico
Flora of the Rocky Mountains
Flora without expected TNC conservation status